Deloneura immaculata, the Mbashe River buff, is a possibly extinct species of butterfly in the family Lycaenidae. It is assumed to be (or to have been) endemic to the densely forested Mbhashe River area of the Eastern Cape, South Africa. Searches subsequent to its discovery however failed to yield any trace of it.

Only three female specimens have ever been collected, all by Colonel James Henry Bowker, in 1863-64. The specimens are held in the South African Museum in Cape Town, and the Natural History Museum in London.

References

Sources

External links
External images of female

Deloneura
Butterflies described in 1868
Extinct insects since 1500
Endemic butterflies of South Africa
Taxonomy articles created by Polbot
Taxa named by Roland Trimen